Kadua romanzoffiensis is a species of flowering plant in the family Rubiaceae, native to parts of the southwestern Pacific (Niue, Samoa, Tokelau and Manihiki, Tuvalu) and much of the south-central Pacific (the Cook Islands, the Line Islands, the Pitcairn Islands, the Society Islands, the Tuamotus, and the Tubuai Islands).

References

romanzoffiensis
Flora of Niue
Flora of Samoa
Flora of Tokelau and Manihiki
Flora of Tuvalu
Flora of the Cook Islands
Flora of the Line Islands
Flora of the Pitcairn Islands
Flora of the Society Islands
Flora of the Tuamotus
Flora of the Tubuai Islands
Plants described in 1829
Taxa named by Adelbert von Chamisso
Flora without expected TNC conservation status